The first lady of the United States is the hostess of the White House. The position is traditionally filled by the wife of the president of the United States, but, on occasion, the title has been applied to women who were not presidents' wives, such as when the president was a bachelor or widower, or when the wife of the president was unable to fulfill the duties of the first lady. The first lady is not an elected position; it carries no official duties and receives no salary. Nonetheless, she attends many official ceremonies and functions of state either along with or in place of the president. Traditionally, the first lady does not hold outside employment while occupying the office, although Eleanor Roosevelt earned money writing and giving lectures, but gave most of it to charity, and Jill Biden has maintained her regular job as an educator during her time in the role. The first lady has her own staff, including the White House social secretary, the chief of staff, the press secretary, the chief floral designer, and the executive chef. The Office of the First Lady is also in charge of all social and ceremonial events of the White House, and is a branch of the Executive Office of the President.

There have been total of 54 first ladies including 43 official and 11 acting, within 46 first ladyships. This discrepancy exists because some presidents had multiple first ladies. Following Joe Biden's inauguration on January 20, 2021, his wife, Jill Biden, became the 43rd official first lady.

There are five living former first ladies: Rosalynn Carter, married to Jimmy Carter; Hillary Clinton, married to Bill Clinton; Laura Bush, married to George W. Bush; Michelle Obama, married to Barack Obama; and Melania Trump, married to Donald Trump. The first first lady was Martha Washington, married to George Washington. Presidents John Tyler and Woodrow Wilson had two official first ladies; both remarried during their presidential tenures. The wives of four presidents died before their husbands were sworn into office but are still considered first ladies by the White House and National First Ladies' Library: Martha Wayles Skelton, married to Thomas Jefferson; Rachel Jackson, married to Andrew Jackson; Hannah Van Buren, married to Martin Van Buren; and Ellen Lewis Herndon Arthur, married to Chester A. Arthur. One woman who was not married to a president is still considered an official first lady: Harriet Lane, niece of bachelor James Buchanan. The other non-spousal relatives who served as White House hostesses are not recognized by the First Ladies' Library.

In 2007, the United States Mint began releasing a set of half-ounce $10 gold coins under the First Spouse Program with engravings of portraits of the first ladies on the obverse. When a president served without a spouse, a gold coin was issued that bears an obverse image emblematic of Liberty as depicted on a circulating coin of that era and a reverse image emblematic of themes of that president's life. This is true for the coins for Thomas Jefferson, Andrew Jackson, Martin Van Buren, and James Buchanan's first ladies, but not the coin for Chester A. Arthur's first lady, which instead depicts suffragette Alice Paul.

Current living first ladies 
Living first ladies  (from oldest to youngest):

List
This list includes all persons who served as first ladies, regardless of whether they were married to the incumbent president or not, as well as persons who are considered first ladies  and the White House Historical Association.

Other spouses of presidents of the United States
Certain spouses of presidents of the United States are not considered first ladies of the United States.

Four presidents were widowed prior to their presidencies:
Thomas Jefferson was married to Martha Wayles from 1772 until her death in 1782.
Andrew Jackson was married to Rachel Donelson from 1794 until her death in 1828.
Martin Van Buren was married to Hannah Hoes from 1807 until her death in 1819.
Chester A. Arthur was married to Ellen Lewis Herndon from 1859 until her death in 1880.

Two presidents were widowed and remarried prior to their presidencies:
Theodore Roosevelt was married to Alice Hathaway Lee from 1880 until her death in 1884. He was subsequently married to Edith Carow from 1886 to his death in 1919.
Joe Biden was married to Neilia Hunter from 1966 until her death in 1972. He has subsequently been married to Jill Jacobs since 1977.

Two presidents were divorced and remarried prior to their presidencies:
Ronald Reagan was married to Jane Wyman from 1940 until 1949. He was subsequently married to Nancy Davis from 1952 to his death in 2004. 
Donald Trump was married to Ivana Zelníčková from 1977 until 1992 and to Marla Maples from 1993 until 1999. He has subsequently been married to Melania Knauss since 2005.

Two presidents remarried after their presidencies:
Millard Fillmore was married to Caroline Carmichael McIntosh from 1858 until his death in 1874.
Benjamin Harrison was married to Mary Scott Lord Dimmick from 1896 until his death in 1901.

See also

Bibliography of United States presidential spouses and first ladies
Second ladies and gentlemen of the United States
First family of the United States
List of children of presidents of the United States
List of current United States first spouses
List of memoirs by first ladies of the United States
List of presidents of the United States
List of First Lady of the United States firsts
Spouse of the prime minister of Canada
First Lady of Mexico

Notes

References

External links
The First Ladies – White House
Biographies of the First Ladies of the United States of America – National First Ladies' Library
First Ladies National Historic Site

First ladies
United States
Lists of wives